Ascalaphus is a genus of owlfly belonging to the tribe Ascalaphini. The species of this genus are found in Africa and Asia.

Species
There are around 23 valid species in this genus:

 Ascalaphus abdominalis (Kimmins, 1949)
 Ascalaphus aethiopicus (Kimmins, 1949)
 Ascalaphus africanus (McLachlan, 1871)
 Ascalaphus barbarus (Linnaeus, 1767)
 Ascalaphus bilineatus (Kolbe, 1897)
 Ascalaphus clavicornis Lichtenstein, 1796
 Ascalaphus dicax Walker, 1853
 Ascalaphus festivus (Rambur, 1842)
 Ascalaphus libelluloides van der Weele, 1909
 Ascalaphus lloydi (Kimmins, 1949)
 Ascalaphus longistigma (McLachlan, 1871)
 Ascalaphus minutus Tjeder, 1986
 Ascalaphus pallidulus Prost, 2013
 Ascalaphus placidus (Gerstaecker, 1894)
 Ascalaphus procax Walker, 1853
 Ascalaphus prothoracicus (Kimmins, 1949)
 Ascalaphus quadrimaculatus Lichtenstein, 1796
 Ascalaphus rougoni Prost, 2013
 Ascalaphus rusticus Lichtenstein, 1796
 Ascalaphus sinister Walker, 1853
 Ascalaphus tessellatus Lichtenstein, 1796
 Ascalaphus vitreipennis Gistel, 1856
 Ascalaphus worthingtoni (Kimmins, 1949)

References

Myrmeleontidae
Neuroptera genera